Senator Stearns may refer to:

Ozora P. Stearns (1831–1896), U.S. Senator from Minnesota
Asahel Stearns (1774–1839), Massachusetts State Senate
Charles H. Stearns (1854–1936), Vermont State Senate
George M. Stearns (1831–1894), Massachusetts State Senate
Onslow Stearns (1810–1878), New Hampshire State Senate